Phillip C. Pflum is a Democratic member of the Indiana House of Representatives, representing the 56th District from 2002 to 2012.

References

External links
Indiana State Legislature – Representative Phil Pflum Official government website
Project Vote Smart – Representative Phillip 'Phil' Pflum (IN) profile
Follow the Money – Phillip C Pflum
2008 2006 2004 2002 campaign contributions

Democratic Party members of the Indiana House of Representatives
1936 births
Living people
People from Wayne County, Indiana